Stereocontrolled 1,2-additions to carbonyl groups (especially ketones) are an important class of reactions because they provide access to substituted alcohols, generating a new stereocenter in the process. Especially widespread are various reagents for stereocontrolled 1,2-hydride additions (or reductions) of ketones. A well-known method to synthesize enantiopure alcohols by ketone reduction is the Midland Alpine borane reduction, named after its inventor Professor M. Mark Midland. The strategy uses a chiral organoborane, derived from the hydroboration of alpha-pinene by 9-BBN, to differentiate enantiotopic faces of a ketone. Following workup with basic hydrogen peroxide, the product alcohols can be obtained, often with high degrees of enantioselectivity. The reaction works best if one of the ketone groups has low steric hindrance, such as an alkyne or nitrile. Another method, first developed in the 1980s, is called the Corey–Bakshi–Shibata reduction (CBS), and it features the use of an oxazaborolidine catalyst along with borane as a reducing agent for accomplishing enantioselective ketone reductions. The CBS reduction has been used extensively by chemists en route to synthesizing a wide variety of natural products, including alkaloids, terpenoids, pheromones, and biotins. Fig. 1 shows an example of a diastereoselective CBS reduction being used to prepare a complex macrocyclic alcohol en route to the synthesis of 11-desmethyllaulimalide (an analog of the antitumor agent laulimalide). The authors noted that CBS reduction was much more effective than using either lithium tert-butoxyaluminum hydride or L-Selectride. The CBS catalyst, usually prepared from diphenylprolinol, often can be used in low catalyst loadings, even as low as 2%.

References 

Addition reactions